Arthur Herman may refer to: 

Art Herman (1871–1955), American professional baseball player
Arthur S. Herman (1891–1977), American professional baseball player and coach
Arthur L. Herman (born 1956), American historian

See also
Arthur Hermann (1893–1958), French gymnast
Herman Arthur (1892–1920), Afro-American World War I veteran who was lynched